RJ Rafiq (born 1 February 1992), also known as Mohammad Rafiq, is an Indian radio jockey, MC, actor and voice over artist, who currently works at Red FM. He presents the Vellapanti Show with RJ Rafiq from 12 PM to 3 PM. He has worked at All India Radio and at DD Kashir. Though mainly a radio jockey, he is also active in emceeing and on digital platforms. RJ Rafiq made his film debut in 2018 with Imtiaz Ali's Laila Majnu playing the role of Touseef.

Early life 
Rafiq was born on 1 February 1992 in the town of Handwara, Jammu and Kashmir. He lost his father in early age and was raised in an orphanage in Kashmir. He attended the welfare educational institutes, Degree College Bemina, Chinab Valley College of education, Maulana Azad National Urdu University, Indira Gandhi National Open University and University of Kashmir.

Career 
While he was studying, he took a job at Bharti Airtel call centre, later he joined local cable network for few months, Rafiq started his radio career from All India Radio as announcer. He has done several shows for Vividh Bharti Srinagar service like Morning show, Film Magazine, Gadget World and many more. He has also appeared as anchor on DD Kashir for zarai khabar.

Rafiq made his film debut in 2018 in Imtiaz Ali's Laila Majnu where he played Tauseef. He currently works at Red FM 93.5 as radio presenter.

Filmography

Films

Discography

Songs

Awards and recognition 
 2021: Awarded the Hero Youth icon.
 2021: Honored with the ‘Kashmir Young Leadership Award’ during the Kashmir Leadership Summit in Srinagar.
 2022: Received the Best EMCEE award in Kashmir
 2023 Received Award at The India Audio Summit and Awards Mumbai

References

Living people
1992 births
Indian radio personalities